De Klijte (French, La Clytte, West Flemish: De Klyte, locally known as De Kliete) is a village in the municipality of Heuvelland in West Flanders, Belgium. Before the 1977 Belgian municipal reforms, De Klijte was part of the municipality Reningelst. Reningelst proper joined Poperinge, but De Klijte joined the new municipality Heuvelland.

The village is located near the hill Scherpenberg.

Data and statistics

Area: 4.93 km²
Population: 576 (2001)
Postal code: 8954

Heuvelland
Populated places in West Flanders